Diego Andrés Ciorciari (born 2 March 1980) is an Argentine professional basketball coach and former player who played at the point guard position. He is assistant coach for San Pablo Burgos of the Spanish LEB Oro.

Early years
He began to play basketball in an amateur club called Rivadavia Juniors, in his home city, Santa Fe.

Professional career
Ciorciari first started to play as a professional in Argentina in 1997, when he was only 17, playing for Ferro Carril Oeste with Luis Scola and Federico Kammerichs among others. Because he was the youngest player of the team, the speaker nicknamed him El 'pichón' Ciorciari, being pichón a baby bird. Despite his height, in 2001 he won the LNB Slam Dunk Contest against Walter Herrmann, after having lost the final the year before.

Afterwards he moved to Austria, where he played only for two months before he moved to Italy, where he played in Lega and Lega-2. In 2003 he signed for CAI Zaragoza, of Spanish second division LEB, and on 4 November 2004 he made his debut in ACB with Bilbao Basket. From 2005 to 2010 he played in the LEB league in different teams, and in May 2010 he won the LEB Play-off with Menorca basket and promoted to ACB.

Unfortunately, his team relegated to the second division and he decided to leave the LEB after 7 seasons in Spain. In 2011, Diego moved to Italy and started playing for Pepsi Caserta but at the end of the year he returned to Argentina after almost ten years abroad and joined Club Gimnasia y Esgrima (Comodoro Rivadavia)

Coaching career
Following retirement, he has started his coaching career by becoming assistant coach for San Pablo Burgos of the Spanish LEB Oro.

References

External links
ACB Profile

1980 births
Living people
Argentine expatriate basketball people in Spain
Argentine men's basketball players
Basket Rimini Crabs players
Basket Zaragoza players
Bilbao Basket players
CB Breogán players
Ferro Carril Oeste basketball players
Gimnasia y Esgrima de Comodoro Rivadavia basketball players
Italian expatriate basketball people in Spain
Italian men's basketball players
Juvecaserta Basket players
Liga ACB players
Melilla Baloncesto players
Menorca Bàsquet players
Point guards
S.S. Felice Scandone players
Sportspeople from Santa Fe, Argentina